Dayanand Medical College is a tertiary care teaching hospital in Ludhiana in North India.

History 

Dr Banarsi Dass Soni, former Captain in the Indian Military Service, conceived the idea in 1934 and started Arya Medical School in a rented building in Civil Lines, Ludhiana. In 1936, the management of the school was handed over to the Arya Samaj, Saban Bazar, Ludhiana, under the aegis of Arya Pratinidhi Sabha, Punjab.

In 1964 the Arya Medical School became a full-fledged MBBS College, which came to be known as Dayanand Medical College & Hospital (DMCH). The management was taken over by Managing Society of Dayanand Medical College & Hospital, Ludhiana, and industrialist Shri H. R. Dhanda became its founder president.

DMCH was the first hospital in Punjab to set up a dialysis unit in the nephrology service in 1980.

It is the first and only institution in India that offers a unique technique of external fixators perfected by Professor Oganesyan from Russia.

MCI recognition 

The institution is accredited by the Medical Council of India for the MBBS course as well as several specialty and super-specialty courses.

The college is affiliated to the Baba Farid University of Health Sciences, Faridkot, Punjab.

Courses offered 
The school offers MBBS, MD/MS postgraduate, PG diploma courses and super-specialties.

The DMCH College of Nursing operates there.

Hero DMC Heart Institute
Since 1 April 2001, the Hero DMC Heart Institute  (HDHI) has provided care to patients with heart and blood vessel disease.

Ranking 

The National Institutional Ranking Framework ranked the institute 24 in the medical category in 2020. The institute was ranked 26 among medical colleges in India in 2020 by India Today.

References

External links 
 
 MD MS ADMISSION 2019-20 IN PUNJAB,INDIA

Medical colleges in Punjab, India
Education in Ludhiana
Science and technology in Ludhiana
1964 establishments in East Punjab